Willkommen im Beerdigungscafé (German for "welcome to the funeral café") is the first studio album by German metalcore band Callejon.

Track listing

External links 
 
 Willkommen im Beerdigungscafé at Callejon's official website

2006 albums
Callejon (band) albums